Brithysternum is a genus of ground beetle in the subfamily Broscinae. The genus was described by William John Macleay in 1873 with the genus being found in Australia and containing the following species:

 Brithysternum calcaratum Macleay, 1873
 Brithysternum macleayi Sloane, 1910
 Brithysternum nodosum Sloane, 1910

References

Broscini
Beetles of Australia
Carabidae genera